Sam Davies may refer to:

 Sam Davies (cricketer) (born 1992), Welsh cricketer
 Sam Davies (footballer, born 1894) (1894–1972), Welsh footballer
 Sam Davies (footballer, born 1870) (1870–1913), English footballer
Sam Davies (rugby player) (born 1993), Welsh rugby union player
Sam Davies (sailor), British yachtswoman
Sam Davies (sprinter), British sprint athlete

See also
Samantha Davies (disambiguation)
Samuel Davies (disambiguation)
Sam Davis (1842–1863), American Confederate army soldier
Sammy Davis (disambiguation)
Samuel Davis (disambiguation)